This is a list of venues used for professional baseball in Toronto, Ontario. The information is a compilation of the information contained in the references listed.

ballpark unknown
Home of: Toronto - Ontario League (1884)

Jarvis Street Lacrosse Grounds
Home of: Toronto - Canadian League (1885)
Location: Jarvis and Wellesley Streets (northwest corner) on William Cawthra's property; used from 1872 to 1890 for lacrosse by the Toronto Lacrosse Club and the Toronto Baseball Club 1885; sold with homes and church built on site; now residential and commercial district called Cawthra Square

Sunlight Park a.k.a. Toronto Baseball Grounds
Home of:
Toronto Canucks International League/Association 1886-1890
Toronto Canadians/Canucks/Royals/Maple Leafs Eastern/International League (1895-1896)
Location: south-west of Queen Street East and Broadview, south to Eastern Avenue
Later usage: Converted to industrial, now some residential

Hanlan's Point Stadium a.k.a. Maple Leaf Park
Home of: Toronto Maple Leafs - International League (1897-1900 or 1901 - sources vary) and (1908 or 1909 - sources vary - through 1925)
Location: Hanlan's Point on the Toronto Islands
Later usage: Converted to parkland after airport was built.

Diamond Park
Home of: Toronto Maple Leafs - International League (1901–1907,1909)
Location: Liberty Street and Fraser Avenue
 Later usage: E. W. Gillett Company factory complex opened on site in 1912; now occupied by Kobo Inc.

ballpark name unknown
Home of: Toronto Beavers - Canadian League 1914 (disbanded mid-season)
Location: unknown

Maple Leaf Stadium
Home of: Toronto Maple Leafs - IL (1926-1967)
Location: the foot of Bathurst Street on the south side of Lake Shore Boulevard (formerly Fleet Street); location also given as 555 Lake Shore Boulevard West, Stadium Road, Western Channel, Bathurst Street
Later usage: Public park and picnic grounds

 Dominico Field (Christie Pits)
Home of: Toronto Maple Leafs -Intercounty baseball (1969-present)
 Location: Bloor Street West at Christie Street

Exhibition Stadium
Home of: Toronto Blue Jays - American League (1977-1988)
Location: New Brunswick Way (right field); Lake Shore Boulevard (first base); Prince's Boulevard (left field)
Currently: site occupied by BMO Field, 170 Prince's Boulevard

Rogers Centre orig. SkyDome
Home of: Toronto Blue Jays - AL (1989-2019, ?-present) (no games in Toronto 2020 - mid-season 2021 due to COVID-19 travel restrictions)
Location: 1 Blue Jays Way (next to CN Tower), north of Lake Shore Boulevard, east of Spadina Avenue.

See also

Lists of baseball parks
Sahlen Field
TD Ballpark

Sources
Peter Filichia, Professional Baseball Franchises, Facts on File, 1993.
Michael Benson, Ballparks of North America, McFarland, 1989.

 Toronto
Toronto
Sports venues in Toronto
Parks
Toronto-related lists
+
Ontario sport-related lists